Trichophilus is a genus of green algae. Trichophilus welckeri is found growing in the fur of certain sloth species and is believed to provide them with camouflage.

References

Ulvophyceae genera
Ulvophyceae